is a multi-purpose dam on the Miyatoko River, a branch of the Naruse River in the town of Taiwa, Kurokawa District  Miyagi Prefecture, Japan. The dam was completed in 1998.

References 

Dams in Miyagi Prefecture
Dams completed in 1998
Taiwa, Miyagi
Gravity dams